The Great Britain men's national field hockey team represents the United Kingdom in Olympic field hockey tournaments. The team won gold at the 1920 Summer Olympics in Antwerp and the 1988 Summer Olympics in Seoul. The team won the 2017 Sultan Azlan Shah Cup.

In all other competitions, including the Hockey World Cup, the Commonwealth Games and some editions of the Hockey Champions Trophy, the four home nations compete in their own right: England, Ireland (includes both the Republic and Northern Ireland), Scotland and Wales.

The team was established in 1920 as Great Britain and Ireland, before the independence of most of Ireland as the Irish Free State. They only played one tournament under that name: the 1920 Summer Olympics in Antwerp, Belgium, when they won the gold medal. Before 1920 there was only one field hockey tournament at the Olympics, in 1908, when England won the gold, Ireland the silver, and Scotland and Wales the bronze medals.

Honours

Summer Olympics
1908 –    
1920 – 
1948 – 
1952 – 
1956 – 4th place
1960 – 4th place
1964 – 9th place
1968 – 12th place
1972 – 6th place
1984 – 
1988 – 
1992 – 6th place
1996 – 7th place
2000 – 6th place
2004 – 9th place
2008 – 5th place
2012 – 4th place
2016 – 9th place
2020 – 5th place

FIH Pro League
2019 – 4th place
2020–21 – 6th place
2022–23 – Qualified

Champions Trophy
1978 – 
1980 – 7th place
1984 – 
1985 – 
1986 – 4th place
1987 – 4th place
1988 – 6th place
1989 – 5th place
1990 – 6th place
1991 – 5th place
1992 – 5th place
1994 – 6th place
2000 – 6th place
2007 – 6th place
2011 – 6th place
2016 – 4th place

Hockey World League
2014–15 – 6th place

Sultan Azlan Shah Cup
2011 – 
2012 – 
2017 –

Players

Current squad
Great Britain Hockey and the British Olympic Association have confirmed the 16 players (+4 reserves) selected to represent Team GB in the 2020 Summer Olympics, in Tokyo, Japan.

Caps and goals (for both England and Great Britain) updated as of 1 August 2021, after Great Britain v India.

Notable former players

Paul Barber (1988 Gold)
Stephen Batchelor (1988 Gold)
Tom Bertram
Kulbir Bhaura (1988 Gold)
Jon Bleby
John Cadman
Robert Clift (1988 Gold)
John Conroy
Matt Daly
Stephen Dick
Adam Dixon
Richard Dodds (1988 Gold)
David Faulkner (1988 Gold)
Russell Garcia (1988 Gold)
Brett Garrard
Calum Giles
Mark Gleghorne
Martyn Grimley (1988 Gold)
Danny Hall
Ben Hawes
Rob Hill
Sean Kerly (1988 Gold)
Jimmy Kirkwood (1988 Gold)
Jason Laslett
Richard Leman (1988 Gold)
David Luckes
Jack MacBryan
Richard Mantell
Simon Mantell
Ben Marsden
Stephen Martin (1988 Gold)
Simon Mason
Christopher Mayer
Alistair McGregor
Barry Middleton
Rob Moore
John Whitley Neill
Veryan Pappin (1988 Gold)
Craig Parnham
Mark Pearn
George Pinner
Jon Potter (1988 Gold)
Imran Sherwani (1988 Gold)
Stanley Shoveller
Ian Taylor (1988 Gold)
James Tindall
Bill Waugh
Jimmy Wallis
David Westcott

Coaches

Bill Vans Agnew, coach during the 1972 Olympics
Dave Vinson
David Whitaker, (1980 - 1988) coach when the team won bronze in the 1984 Olympics and gold in the 1988 Olympics
Norman Hughes
Jason Lee (2004–2012). Coach at the 2004, 2008 and 2012 Summer Olympics
Bobby Crutchley (February 2013 – May 2018). Coach at the 2016 Summer Olympics
Danny Kerry (September 2018 – January 2022)

Fixtures & Results

2020-21 Fixtures & Results

2020-21 Men's FIH Pro League

2020 Summer Olympics

See also
Great Britain women's national field hockey team
England men's national hockey team
Ireland men's national field hockey team
Scotland men's national field hockey team
Wales men's national field hockey team
Great Britain men's national field hockey team Fixtures & Results 2017-2020

References

External links

FIH Profile

1920 establishments in the United Kingdom
National team
European men's national field hockey teams
Field Hockey